Isyaku Rabiu  (9 October 1925 – 7 May 2018) was a Nigerian businessman and Islamic scholar who founded a major holding company in Kano State. He was a supporter of Ibrahim Niasse's Tijaniyyah brotherhood.

Life
Rabiu was born to the family of Muhammadu Rabiu Dan Tinki, a Quranic preacher from the Bichi area of Kano State who led his own Quranic school. From 1936 to 1942, Rabiu attended his father's school learning the Quran and Arabic. He then moved to Maiduguri, Borno for further Islamic education. After spending four years in Maiduguri, he returned to Kano prepared to be an Islamic scholar. In 1949, Rabiu was an independent teacher of Arabic and the Quran who had among his audience Ibrahim Musa Gashash.

In the early 1950s while still a teacher, Rabiu began to engage in private enterprise and established Isyaku Rabiu & Sons in 1952. Originally the firm acted as an agent of UAC and was trading in sewing machines, religious books and bicycles. In 1958, the firm had a breakthrough when Kaduna Textile Limited was established and it became one of the early distributors.

Rabiu emerged as the leading distributor of the company in Northern Nigeria. In 1963, he joined a consortium of businessmen from Kano who came together to form the Kano Merchants Trading Company.  The establishments continued to survive withstanding competition from foreign products. In 1970, he established a suit and packing factory.

Rabiu was a supporter of the National Party of Nigeria and likely benefited from state patronage as a result.

Isyaku Rabiu & Sons group
Isyaku Rabiu & Sons, founded by Rabiu, is a family operated holding company with a history of investment in manufacturing, insurance, banking and real estate. In the 1970s, the group invested in manufacturing with its first investment being the Kano Suit and Packing Cases company, a factory producing suit cases and handbags. The firm was a joint venture with Lebanese investors.

In 1972, he formed the Bagauda Textile Mill, manufacturing woven cloths for uniforms.

Rabiu then established a series of ventures in different segments of the economy including frozen food service, real estate, sugar and a motor vehicle and parts distribution company specialized in Daihatsu products. However, unfavorable exchange rates and economic conditions forced the company to scale back on manufacturing and returning to its trading roots.

References

1925 births
2018 deaths
Nigerian businesspeople
People from Kano